Burton is a civil parish in Staffordshire, England. It covers an area in the centre and north-east of Burton upon Trent. The population of the civil parish taken at the 2011 census was 2,632. The parish was created on 1 April 2003.

See also
Listed buildings in Burton, Staffordshire (civil parish)

References 

Civil parishes in Staffordshire
Burton upon Trent